Jeny Velazco Reyes is a Paralympian athlete from Mexico competing mainly in category F57/58 javelin events.

She competed in the 2008 Summer Paralympics in Beijing, China. There, she won a bronze medal in the women's Javelin throw F57/F58 event.

External links
 

Paralympic athletes of Mexico
Athletes (track and field) at the 2008 Summer Paralympics
Paralympic bronze medalists for Mexico
Mexican female javelin throwers
Living people
Year of birth missing (living people)
Medalists at the 2008 Summer Paralympics
Paralympic medalists in athletics (track and field)
Medalists at the 2007 Parapan American Games
Medalists at the 2011 Parapan American Games
Medalists at the 2015 Parapan American Games
21st-century Mexican women